John Williams (1831October 30, 1899) was an American sailor who was awarded the Medal of Honor for his actions during the American Civil War.

Biography 
John Williams was born in 1831 in Elizabethtown, New Jersey. He served as a Boatswain's Mate aboard the USS Mohican. He earned his medal in action on November 7, 1861 at Hilton Head, South Carolina. He died in Brooklyn, New York on October 30, 1899 and is now buried in the Holy Cross Cemetery.

Medal of Honor citation

References 

1831 births
1899 deaths
American Civil War recipients of the Medal of Honor

United States Navy Medal of Honor recipients